Tin Sam Tsuen is a village in Fung Yuen, Tai Po, Hong Kong.

Administration
Tin Sam Tsuen is one of the villages represented within the Tai Po Rural Committee. For electoral purposes, Tin Sam Tsuen is part of the Hong Lok Yuen constituency, which was formerly represented by Zero Yiu Yeuk-sang until May 2021.

References

Villages in Tai Po District, Hong Kong